SGA may refer to:

 Old Irish language (ISO 639-3 code)
 Schwarz-Gelbe Allianz (Black-Yellow Alliance), an Austrian political party
 Second-generation antipsychotics
 Séminaire de Géométrie Algébrique du Bois Marie, an influential mathematical seminar and the series of books it produced.
 SGA Airlines (Siam General Aviation), a regional airline in Thailand
 SG&A, Selling, General and Administrative expenses in income statements
 Simple Genetic Algorithm
 Small for gestational age, babies whose birth weight lies below the 10th percentile for that gestational age
 Society of Graphic Art, a British arts organization founded in 1919
 Songwriters Guild of America, an organization to help "advance, promote, and benefit" the profession of songwriters
 Southern Governors' Association
 Standard Galactic Alphabet, the writing system in the Commander Keen fictional universe
 Stargate Atlantis, an American-Canadian science fiction television series and a spin-off from the television series Stargate SG-1
 Student Government Association, a student organization dedicated to social and organizational activities of the student body
 Substantial gainful activity, a term defined by the U.S. Social Security Administration to describe work that involves physical or mental effort and is ordinarily done for pay
 Swanson Group Aviation, Formerly Superior Helicopter of Glendale, Oregon, a heavy lift helicopter operator
 Swedish Game Awards, Sweden's largest video game development competition
 Synthetic genetic array analysis - a high throughput methodology for studying genetic interactions
 System Global Area, a shared memory structure that is created by Oracle databases at instance startup
 Samsung Galaxy Ace, an Android smartphone manufactured by Samsung
 Segesterone acetate, a progestin medication
 Shai Gilgeous-Alexander, Canadian professional basketball player

 Supraglottic Airway, an airway management device